Shane Niemi (born June 2, 1978, in Kamloops, British Columbia is a retired Canadian sprints athlete. As a 17 year old he took the bronze medal in the 400 metres at the 1995 Pan American Junior Athletics Championships behind Obea Moore's then World Youth Best.  The same three athletes (Jerome Young in silver position) finished in the same order at the 1996 World Junior Championships in Athletics.  He returned to the 1997 Pan American Junior Athletics Championships to take the gold medal in the event.  He was not able to make the qualifying standard for the 2000 Olympics.  He ran his personal record, the Canadian record, 44.86 at the 2001 Jeux de la Francophonie (French Games) on home soil in Ottawa to take gold.  He made the semi-finals at 2001 World Championships in Athletics and the following year earned the silver medal at the 2002 Commonwealth Games beating the world champion Avard Moncur.  He won six straight Canadian championships between 1998 and 2003.  Unable to make the qualifying mark to the 2004 Olympics, he retired in late 2004.

Competition record

He holds the current BC high school track and field 400m record of 46.8 in 1996 while he was attending Westsyde Secondary School in Kamloops.

Personal bests
200 metres - 20.61 s, Edmonton 2001
400 metres - 44.86 s, Ottawa 2001

References

External links

1978 births
Athletes (track and field) at the 1998 Commonwealth Games
Athletes (track and field) at the 2002 Commonwealth Games
Athletes (track and field) at the 1999 Pan American Games
Athletes (track and field) at the 2003 Pan American Games
Canadian male sprinters
Living people
Sportspeople from Kamloops
Commonwealth Games medallists in athletics
Commonwealth Games silver medallists for Canada
Pan American Games track and field athletes for Canada
Medallists at the 2002 Commonwealth Games